Roy Boesiger is a Swiss para-alpine skier. He represented Switzerland at the 1994 Winter Paralympics held in Lillehammer, Norway in alpine skiing.

He won the gold medal in the Men's Giant Slalom B1 event.

He also competed in the Men's Super-G B1 and Men's Slalom B1-2 events but did not win a medal.

References

External links 
 

Living people
Year of birth missing (living people)
Place of birth missing (living people)
Paralympic alpine skiers of Switzerland
Swiss male alpine skiers
Alpine skiers at the 1994 Winter Paralympics
Medalists at the 1994 Winter Paralympics
Paralympic gold medalists for Switzerland
Paralympic medalists in alpine skiing
20th-century Swiss people